Matthew Wyatt may refer to:

 Matthew Digby Wyatt (1820–1877), British architect and art historian
 Matthew Cotes Wyatt (1777–1862), painter and sculptor